Athlete A is a 2020 American documentary film directed by Bonni Cohen and Jon Shenk. The documentary follows a team of investigative journalists from The Indianapolis Star as they broke the story of doctor Larry Nassar sexually assaulting young female gymnasts and the subsequent allegations that engulfed USA Gymnastics (USAG) and its then-CEO Steve Penny. It was released on June 24, 2020, by Netflix.

The title refers to gymnast Maggie Nichols who was referred to as "Athlete A" to protect her identity while investigations into her sexual abuse by USAG doctor Larry Nassar were ongoing.

Summary
While researching a story on the failure of schools to report sexual abuse, a reporter at The Indianapolis Star has a source reach out to her to suggest she look into USAG. The reporters at The Star collaborate on a piece that reveals that Steve Penny, president of the organization, worked to cover for abusive coaches. When the piece is published in 2014, Rachael Denhollander, Jessica Howard, and Jamie Dantzscher independently reach out to the team at The Star to reveal that they were sexually abused by USAG doctor Larry Nassar. Only Denhollander is willing to immediately speak on the record during her interview she reveals that she is finally ready to come forward and plans on speaking to the police about what happened to her.

In 2015, gymnast Maggie Nichols is sexually abused by Nassar at the Karolyi Ranch and reveals the abuse to her coach who informs her parents. Her parents are called by Penny, who informs them he has reached out to law enforcement to investigate the abuse.

In 2016, The Star publishes its investigation into Nassar and Denhollander goes to the police with her evidence against Nassar. Maggie Nichols's parents, frustrated with the lack of information about their daughter's case, reach out to a lawyer who is working with other victims and discover that USAG was told of abuse going back at least as far as 2012. The criminal prosecution of Nassar goes forward, and he reaches a plea deal in 2017. Nevertheless, The Star continues to investigate the abuses perpetrated by USAG.

Penny is eventually arrested in 2017 for his role in covering up Nassar's abuse.

Nichols leaves elite gymnastics after being left off the 2016 US gymnastics Olympics team, which the documentary implies was because of her role in coming forward against Nassar. She competes in National Collegiate Athletic Association (NCAA) gymnastics, which reinvigorates her love of the sport.

Release
Athlete A was scheduled to have its world premiere at the Tribeca Film Festival on April 17, 2020, but the festival was canceled due to the COVID-19 pandemic. The film therefore premiered when it was released on Netflix on June 24, 2020.

Reception

Critical response 
 On Metacritic, the film has a weighted average score of 85 out of 100, based on 12 critics, indicating "universal acclaim".

Accolades

References

External links

2020 films
2020 documentary films
2020s American films
2020s English-language films
2020s sports films
American sports documentary films
Documentary films about child abuse
Documentary films about women's sports
English-language Netflix original films
Films about child sexual abuse
Films about the Olympic Games
Films scored by Jeff Beal
Films shot in Indiana
Gymnastics in the United States
The Indianapolis Star
Netflix original documentary films
Women's gymnastics